Donald Rubinstein is a film composer, singer/songwriter, and multi-media artist who is best known for his collaborations with George A. Romero and Avant-garde jazz/rock collaborations with such musicians as Bill Frisell, Emil Richards and Wayne Horvitz.

Education
Rubinstein began music studies at Washington University after rejecting his initial studies with Pulitzer Prize winning poet Howard Nemerov. He taught himself the guitar and piano, transferred to the conservatory, and received a B.A. in music from Washington University in 1972. Rubinstein continued studies for two semesters at the Berklee College of Music in Boston. He quit studies after finding the experience to be too constraining for his experimental ideas. Rubinstein then went on to study on private scholarship with noted piano instructor Margaret Chaloff.

Film scoring for George A. Romero
Donald Rubinstein was 24 when he was first introduced to famed horror filmmaker George A. Romero through his brother Richard P. Rubinstein, who had produced Martin for the writer-director. Rubinstein wrote the music for Martin and his soundtrack would become a highly sought collector's item that Mojo magazine called "One of the top 100 Coolest Soundtracks of All Time."

When Romero next turned Camelot into a motorcycle Renaissance Faire for Knightriders, Donald Rubinstein would compose an equally innovative score, as well as appear in the film as the leader of a musical trio. Rubinstein became close friends with Ed Harris on Knightriders, and would later write an unused score for the actor's directorial debut on Pollock. In 2000, Rubinstein composed the score for Romero's allegorical horror film Bruiser.

Donald Rubinstein's other soundtrack work includes the main title for the television series Tales From the Darkside (as well as its film adaptation).  He wrote the main title and episodic music for the television series Monsters. Rubinstein also co-wrote and performed "Ain't Nothin' Like a Friend" with Ed Harris, for the Harris directed feature soundtrack, Appaloosa. He scored the documentary feature, Tangled Up In Bob: Searching For Bob Dylan and the German Documentary feature Blender, (2015). Perseverance Records will be releasing selections from that soundtrack along with selections from Rubinstein's soundtrack for Bruiser in 2016. In March 2014 Perseverance released Dawn Imagined, which included concert works based on Rubinstein's original sketches for George Romero's Dawn of the Dead.  Rubinstein's score for Martin was released for a fourth time in May 2015 by Ship To Shore Phonograph Company.

Recordings
As a prolific jazz composer, Rubinstein has partnered with Hank Roberts, Vinny Golia, Bob Moses and Marty Ehrlich, among many other notable performers, collaborating with them in both film recording sessions and live performances. Peter Gordon (Boston Symphony Orchestra) commissioned a work for French Horn and subsequently a jazz trio, including celebrated bassist Anthony Jackson and percussionist Gordon Gottlieb (New York Philharmonic Orchestra). Jazziz Magazine included the duet "Fingers" by Rubinstein and Bill Frisell on their "Celebration of the Modern Era" special edition 20th anniversary CD in 2003.

Also, a critically acclaimed singer/songwriter Donald's work crosses normal boundaries. In 2009 he completed a CD of original songs, "When She Kisses the Ship On His Arm," for Bare Bones Records, which included a vocal-duet with "country outlaw" Terry Allen.  Rubinstein has co-written a number of songs with Allen including "Vampires Parade" for his 2010 release "Too Late to Die," which featured long-time Allen collaborator Lloyd Maines. 2010 saw the release of three new Rubinstein CDs. Rubinstein released five varied recordings on three different labels from 2011-2016. 2020 marked the release of three new additions to Rubinstein's discography via his own Hijo Records Label. They included The Famous Singer, Eternity, and 36 Year Serenade, The Songs of Donald Rubinstein (Various artists). In 2022 Scare Flair Records is releasing a second edition LP of Rubinstein's score for Knightriders. Second Sight Films (UK) is likewise releasing a fifth edition CD of his score for Martin.   Rubinstein has released 30 CDs of original music to date. Of Rubinstein's musical work, Steve Huey of Allmusic wrote, "Singer/songwriter, pianist, jazz experimentalist, soundtrack composer, beat-style poet -- Donald Rubinstein has somehow juggled all those hats over the lengthy span of his creative career."

Art and theater works
Beginning in the late 70s, Rubinstein's theatrical works often included iconic storyteller Brother Blue, with whom he partnered in numerous situations including when they both acted in the movie Knightriders. Ed Harris and the Met Theatre produced "Buddha Baby" and "Premonitions" in Los Angeles. Rubinstein's third multi-media performance work, "Strum Road" also premiered there in 1997 to critical acclaim. 

Rubinstein has been exhibited at both The Museum of Modern Art and The Whitney Museum of American Art in New York City in collaboration with the famed artist Kiki Smith. His single song CD, "Ruby Star," sung in duet with Robin Holcomb, was first sold exclusively at The Museum of Modern Art in 2003. During 2007 The Center for Contemporary Art, Santa Fe, presented a 'thus far' large-scale celebration of Donald's work, including a screening of films he scored, two art exhibits, and a concert performance with special guests John Densmore, Hani Naser and Terry Allen. It also included Rubinstein's directing premiere, "Tales From the Edge," a short animated film based on his drawings. Donald Rubinstein was awarded, via nomination, a fellowship, and residency from the Robert Rauschenberg Foundation in February 2014.  His work was subsequently featured in the Boston Print Bicentennial and Fountain Art Fair in NYC.  Rubinstein published three books of writings and drawings on his own Hijo Records and Press in 2020, including "The Musician's Book of Miracles", "Joke Book", and "Ancestors."

Personal life
Rubinstein currently lives with his family in Santa Fe, NM.

Awards
 1997: ASCAP Special Award in Theater Arts
 1999: Banff Centre, Leighton Colony, Composer Residency  
 2001: Ucross Foundation, Composer Residency
 2007: ASCAP Plus Award for Jazz/Popular Composition
 2009: ASCAP Plus Award for Jazz Composition
 2010: Fundación Valparaíso, Spain, Composer Residency/Fellowship
 2014: Rauschenberg Foundation Residency (by nomination)
 2022: ASCAP Plus Award for Jazz/Popular Composition

Discography
 Martin (LP, Varese Sarabande Records, 1979)
 The Witness (Cassette, Desert Link Records, 1984)
 Tales from the Darkside: The Movie (GNP Crescendo Records, 1991)
 Time Again (Rhombus Records, 1997)
 Scars and Dreams (Blue Horse Records, 1998)
 Martin (Levelgreen Records, CD reissue 1999)
 A Man Without Love (Blue Horse Records, 1999)
 Music For Ocean Travel (Blue Horse Records, 2000)
 Long Parade (Blue Horse Records, 2000)
 Maya (Rhombus Records, 2001)
 Painted Stranger (Rhombus Records, 2001)
 Ruby Star (single song CD, produced for Museum of Modern Art Exhibit with Kiki Smith, 2003)
 A Celebration of the Modern Era (Jazziz, 2003)
 Bruiser (Black Starlight Records, 2004)
 Lost Trail Hymn (Black Starlight Records, 2005)
 Circus Boy (Black Starlight Records, 2006)
 Acceptance (Rhombus Records, 2007)
 Tangled Up In Bob & Other Songs (Rhombus Records, 2007)
 Martin; The Unused Score From Pollock (Perseverance Records, 2007)
 Take the Dark Away (Spacebar Recordings, 2008)
 Knightriders (Perseverance Records, 2008)
 When She Kisses the Ship On His Arm (Bare Bones Records, 2009)
 Too Late to Die (Bare Bones Records, 2010)
 Love Hunger (Bare Bones Records, 2010)
 Life Is Orange (self release MANSTEIN: Jono Manson & Donald Rubinstein, 2010)
 Paper PIeces for Key Board (Bare Bones Records, 2013)
 Dawn Imagined (Perseverance Records, 2014)
 Bruiser/Blender (Perseverance Records, 2016)
 The Famous Singer (Hijo Records, 2020)
 Eternity (Hijo Records, 2020)
 36 Year Serenade The Songs of Donald Rubinstein, Various Artists (Hijo Records, 2020)

References

External links
 
 
 Donald Rubinstein on Perseverance Records

1952 births
Living people
Musicians from Brooklyn
Berklee College of Music alumni
Sam Fox School of Design & Visual Arts alumni
American jazz musicians
People from Santa Fe, New Mexico
American film score composers
Varèse Sarabande Records artists
Jazz musicians from New York (state)
Singer-songwriters from New York (state)